Events from the year 1513 in India.

Events
 Bakht Mal becomes king of Nurpur, succeeding Bhil Pal on the latter's death (reigns until 1557 or 1558)
 Construction of Jama Masjid, Champaner begins
 Jain temples are built at Achalgarh Fort

Births
 Jiva Goswami, writer of philosophical works on the theology and practice of Bhakti yoga, Vaishnava Vedanta and associated disciplines is born in Ramakeli in the district of Maldah, West Bengal (dies 1596 or 1598)

Deaths
 Bhil Pal, king of Nurpur (born 1473)

See also
 Timeline of Indian history

References